Northborough is a census-designated place (CDP) in the town of Northborough in Worcester County, Massachusetts, United States.  The population was 6,167 at the 2010 census.

Geography
According to the United States Census Bureau, the CDP has a total area of 8.6 km (3.3 mi).  8.6 km (3.3 mi) of it is land and 0.30% is water.

Demographics

At the 2000 census there were 6,257 people, 2,294 households, and 1,663 families in the CDP.  The population density was 729.9/km (1,889.3/mi).  There were 2,350 housing units at an average density of 274.1/km (709.6/mi).  The racial makeup of the CDP was 93.62% White, 0.69% Black or African American, 0.11% Native American, 4.20% Asian, 0.08% Pacific Islander, 0.32% from other races, and 0.97% from two or more races. Hispanic or Latino of any race were 1.21%.

Of the 2,294 households 40.3% had children under the age of 18 living with them, 61.1% were married couples living together, 8.8% had a female householder with no husband present, and 27.5% were non-families. 22.6% of households were one person and 8.6% were one person aged 65 or older.  The average household size was 2.67 and the average family size was 3.19.

The age distribution was 28.3% under the age of 18, 4.5% from 18 to 24, 32.2% from 25 to 44, 23.2% from 45 to 64, and 11.9% 65 or older.  The median age was 37 years. For every 100 females, there were 91.8 males.  For every 100 females age 18 and over, there were 89.6 males.

The median household income was $67,292 and the median family income  was $81,414. Males had a median income of $54,333 versus $38,576 for females. The per capita income for the CDP was $28,600.  About 1.6% of families and 3.1% of the population were below the poverty line, including 1.8% of those under age 18 and 13.1% of those age 65 or over.

References

Census-designated places in Worcester County, Massachusetts
Census-designated places in Massachusetts